Alupka (Ukrainian and Russian: Алу́пка; ; , Alòpex) is a resort city located in the Crimean peninsula, a territory of Ukraine currently annexed by Russian Federation (see 2014 Crimean crisis). It is famous for the Vorontsov Palace, designed by English architect Edward Blore in an extravagant mixture of Scottish baronial and Neo-Moorish styles and built in 1828–1846 for prince Mikhail Semyonovich Vorontsov.Population:  8,087 (2021).
Area: 4.2246 km2.
Sister-city: Apopka, Florida, USA.

Alupka and its surrounding area is full of resort hotels on the shore of the Black Sea, where thousands of travelers (particularly from the former Soviet Union) travel every year. Public transport to Alupka includes the bus system (bus routes #26 and #27 from Yalta) and other road vehicles.

Climate
The average rainfall in the city is 400 mm per year, the average humidity is about 69%, and the average number of sunlight per year is 2,150 hours.

History

Alupka was first founded as a Greek settlement. The name originates from the Greek word for fox (Alopex) . After the Greeks, Alupka came under control of the Byzantine Empire. The first written mention of Alupka dates to 960 in a document about the Byzantine Emperor Romanos II. Later on, Alupka was controlled by the Crimean Tatars. After 1783 the city came into possession of Grigori Alexandrovich Potemkin, governor-general of the Novorossiya Krai. In 1798, the city had a population of 211, consisting mainly of farmers.

At the end of 19th and beginning of the 20th centuries, Alupka was a famous resort. In the middle of 19th century it was more popular than Yalta, mostly because of the work of the Governor of Novorossia at the time, Mikhail Vorontsov, who built a Palace there (some call it a Castle).

Alupka is described by a French traveler in 1811 in his letters to a friend (starting at page127) "Voyage de Moscou à Vienne, par Kiow, Odessa, Constantinople, Bucharest et Hermanstadt; ou, Lettres adressées à Jules Griffith
Auguste de Lagarde" Jan 1824 · Treuttel et Würtz: https://play.google.com/store/books/details?id=p1THCvg9rVEC&rdid=book-p1THCvg9rVEC&rdot=1

Attractions
Alupka is not only a resort town, but also an important tourist attraction. Major attractions in the city include:
Vorontsov Palace
Vorontsov's Park, located on the grounds of the Vorontsov Palace
Ai-Petri Mountain

Vorontsovsky Palace and Park

The main attraction of Alupka is the Scottish baronial and Neo-Moorish style Vorontsov's Palace, which was designed by the English architect Edward Blore built in 1828-1846 for prince Mikhail Semyonovich Vorontsov. During the Yalta Conference, the palace—spared by the Germans during World War II — served as the residence of Sir Winston Churchill and his English delegation.

A large English-style park was designed and built for prince Vorontsov on the territory of the Vorontsov's Palace. The park was constructed from December 1824 to April 1851, and was envisioned, designed, created, and maintained by Chief Botanist of the Southern Shore of the Crimea, Carolus Antonius Keebach. Plant material for the garden was supplied from the Nikita Botanic Garden by its director, Nicolai Anders von Hartwiss.

There is also a selection of various Hotels and restaurants. There are many things to do in central Alupka such as look at Ai Petri mountain and even take a cable car there.

Ai-Petri Mountain

Alupka is located at the foot of the 1234 meter Ai-Petri (St Peter) Mount of the Crimean Mountains chain. Since 1987, a three kilometer Gondola lift, one of the longest in Europe and split into two stages, carries passengers to and from the mountain, providing visitors with excellent views of the surrounding area and the Black Sea.

People from Alupka
Amet-khan Sultan  Crimean Tatar flying ace and test pilot
Alexander Khmelik  Russian film producer, screenwriter
Evgeni Aldonin  Russian footballer

References

External links

Vorontsov's Castle in Alupka — Pictures of Alupka Palace
 — Alupka: Vorontsov's Palace and Park
 — Webpage of the Alupka Castle 

 
Seaside resorts in Russia
Seaside resorts in Ukraine
Cities of district significance in Ukraine
Cities in Crimea
Yalta Municipality